The 2022–23 Al Ahly season is the 115th season in the football club's history and 64th consecutive and overall season in the top flight of Egyptian football, the Egyptian Premier League. In addition to the domestic league, Al Ahly also are participating in this season's editions of the domestic cup, the Egypt Cup, the Egyptian Super Cup, and the first-tier African cup, the CAF Champions League and the FIFA Club World Cup.

Players

Current squad

Stats As of October 2022

Transfers

Transfers in

Loans in

Transfers out

Loans out

Competitions

Overview

Friendlies

Egyptian Premier League

League table

Results summary

Results by round

Matches

Egypt Cup

2021–22 Egypt Cup
All times are CAT (UTC+2).

2023 EFA Cup

Egyptian Super Cup

CAF Champions League

Al Ahly entered the competition for the 25th consecutive time despite coming third in the league last season, as the League was not finished by the CAF deadline. As a result, the Egyptian Football Association announced that Zamalek and Al Ahly, who were at first and second place after 24 rounds respectively, represented Egypt in the 2022–23 CAF Champions League. Al Ahly were ranked first in the CAF 5-year ranking prior to the start of the 2022–23 season. As a result, they entered the competition from the Second round.

Qualifying rounds

Second round

Group stage

Group B

FIFA Club World Cup

Al Ahly will be participating in the tournament as the CAF representative after Wydad qualified as the host.

Statistics

Goalscorers

Clean sheets

Notes

References

Al Ahly SC seasons
Egyptian football clubs 2022–23 season
2022–23 CAF Champions League participants seasons